The Australian Department of Industry was a department of the Australian Government charged with shaping Australia's future economy through skills, discovery and innovation. The Department existed between September 2013 and December 2014.

Ministerial officeholders were:
 The Minister for Industry the Hon Ian Macfarlane 
The Parliamentary Secretary to the Minister for Industry the Hon Bob Baldwin

References

Industry
2014 disestablishments in Australia
2013 establishments in Australia